The Kavarna Wind Farm is a proposed wind power project in Kavarna, Bulgaria. It will have 100 individual wind turbines with a nominal output of around 2 MW which will deliver up to 200 MW of power, enough to power over 79,800 homes, with a capital investment required of approximately US$450 million.

See also

Eolica Varna Wind Farm
Plambeck Bulgarian Wind Farm

References

Proposed wind farms in Bulgaria